Frederik J. Simons is a Flemish Belgian
geophysicist. He is a professor at Princeton University in the Department of Geosciences.
From 2010 to 2013, Simons was the
Dusenbury University Preceptor of Geological & Geophysical Sciences. From 2004 to 2006, he was a lecturer in the Department of Earth Sciences at University College London. Between 2002 and 2004 he was a
Harry H. Hess Postdoctoral Fellow in the
Department of Geosciences and a Beck Fellow with the Council on
Science and Technology, also at Princeton University.

Education

Frederik Simons was born in Antwerp, Belgium. He graduated primus perpetuus from Our Lady College, Antwerp Jesuit School in 1992. Simons earned his Bachelor's and Master's of Science from KU Leuven in 1996, and his Ph. D.  in Geophysics at Massachusetts Institute of Technology (MIT) in 2002.

Academic career

Simons has worked on a variety of theoretical problems in solid-earth geophysics, seismology, geodesy, and geomagnetism. 
Also involved in the design of instrumentation, he founded the international EarthScope-Oceans consortium, devoted to instrumenting the oceans for global geophysics. 
A well-known example is the MERMAID (Mobile Earthquake Recording in Marine Areas by Independent Divers) instrument, a passively drifting autonomous mid-column hydrophone. The idea of collecting earthquake data for global tomography by robotic drifters is credited to Guust Nolet, a Princeton Professor of geophysics emeritus, who was Simons' postdoctoral advisor. With their colleagues at the Scripps Institution of Oceanography in San Diego, California, they launched the first MERMAID prototype in 2003. The second-generation MERMAID was built by Teledyne Webb Research with support from the European Research Council. The third-generation MERMAID was developed with Yann Hello  and is commercialized by French engineering company OSEAN SAS.

Awards
 2022 IUGG, Vladimir Keilis-Borok Medal 
2018 IRIS Consortium/Seismological Society of America, Distinguished Lecturer 
2012 National Science Foundation, CAREER Award
2008 Royal Academy of Science, Letters and Fine Arts of Belgium, Prix quadriennal Charles Lagrange
1998 Massachusetts Institute of Technology, Victor J. DeCorte Graduate Fellowship
1997 KU Leuven, Biennial prize for an M. Sc. Thesis in geology
1996-1997 Belgian American Educational Foundation, Honorary Fellow
1996-1997 Fulbright Program, Grantee 
1996-1997 Rotary Foundation, Ambassadorial Scholar
1992  Our Lady College, Antwerp, Primus perpetuus, Antwerpen, Belgium

External links

 The Council on Science and Technology at Princeton
The Simons Laboratories at Princeton
Frederik J. Simons Department Profile
Frederik Simons IAS Profile
 EarthScope-Oceans

References

1974 births
Living people
Scientists from Antwerp
Princeton University faculty
KU Leuven alumni
Massachusetts Institute of Technology alumni